Grujić is a Serbian surname, a patronymic derived from Gruja, itself a diminutive of names Grubаn and Grubаš. People with this surname include:

Duško Grujić (born 1972), Serbian footballer 
Katarina Grujić (born 1992), Serbian singer
Marko Grujić (born 1996), Serbian footballer
Nebojša Grujić (born 1991), Serbian sprint canoer
Nikanor Grujić (1810–1887), Serbian bishop
Sava Grujić (1840–1913), Serbian statesman
Slobodan Grujić (born 1973), Serbian table tennis player
Spira Grujić (born 1971), Serbian footballer
Vladan Grujić (born 1981), Bosnia-Herzegovina footballer

Serbian surnames
Patronymic surnames